Don or Donald McGuire may refer to:

 Don McGuire (television executive) (?–2020), American television sports executive
 Don McGuire (actor) (1919–1999), American actor, director, screenwriter and producer
 Donald McGuire (?–2018), singer in The Hilltoppers